"I'd Lie to You for Love" is a song co-written and recorded by American country music duo The Bellamy Brothers.  It was released in September 1985 as the second single from the album Howard & David.  The song reached number 2 on the Billboard Hot Country Singles & Tracks chart.  It was written by David Bellamy, Howard Bellamy, Frankie Miller and Jeff Barry.

The song was originally released in 1984 by the rock band Champion.

Chart performance

Danny Spanos version

The Bellamy Brothers version

References

1985 singles
1985 songs
The Bellamy Brothers songs
Songs written by Frankie Miller
Song recordings produced by Emory Gordy Jr.
Songs written by Jeff Barry
Song recordings produced by Jimmy Bowen
MCA Records singles
Curb Records singles
Songs written by David Bellamy (singer)
Songs written by Howard Bellamy